Ronald M. Cameron (born 1945) is an American businessman, and the owner and chairman of Mountaire Farms.

Early life
Cameron is the son of Ted Cameron, who was chairman of Mountaire, and grandson of Guy Cameron, who founded Mountaire Corporation in 1914 (although it was then known by a different name).

He earned a bachelor's degree in business from the University of Arkansas.

Career
Cameron joined Mountaire in 1968, and became president and CEO in 1978, after the death of his father. Mountaire is the sixth-largest poultry company in the US.

In 2009, Cameron was named the 14th richest Arkansan by Arkansas Business.

Cameron is also a member of Bear State Financial Holdings LLC, which bought First Federal Bancshares of Arkansas Inc. The CEO of First Federal, Dabbs Cavin, is a former employee of Cameron's. Cameron is the former director of Doulos Ministries in Littleton, Colorado.

Political activities
Cameron is a major donor to Arkansas politician Tom Cotton and The Club for Growth. Cameron also donated a million dollars to Freedom Partners in 2014. In the Republican Party presidential primaries, 2016 he contributed  $3 million to the Super PAC supporting Mike Huckabee and after Huckabee dropped out donated 5 million to Conservative Solutions PAC which supported Marco Rubio's bid.

Personal life
Cameron is married to Nina, they have four children, and live in Arkansas.

References

External links
Political campaign contributions by year

American businesspeople
Living people
University of Arkansas alumni
1940s births
Arkansas Republicans